Zokir Almatov (born 10 October 1949 in Zangiata, Tashkent Region, Uzbek SSR, Soviet Union), sometimes romanized Zakir, was an Uzbek politician who was the interior minister of Uzbekistan until 2005.

In 1967 he graduated from high school and immediately began to work at the Tashavtomash plant. He joined the Soviet Army in 1971, serving in the Internal Troops. In 1976 he graduated from Tashkent State University's Faculty of Law, which allowed him to work in district police departments around the country. From 1990 to 1991, he was Head of the Internal Affairs Directorate of the Tashkent Regional Executive Committee. On September 16, 1991, as a Colonel Almatov, was appointed as the first Minister of Internal Affairs of the Republic of Uzbekistan, succeeding his Soviet counterpart Vyacheslav Kamalov. He announced his retirement due to his poor health in 2005, and was officially dismissed in early 2006. In December 2016, he came out of retirement and came back into the political sphere, becoming the Chairman of the State Anti-Corruption Commission of Uzbekistan. Despite this, his appointment was not published and or confirmed by official documents. On February 27, 2018, Almatov was appointed as special adviser to the Interior Minister of Uzbekistan.

References

People from Tashkent Region
Government ministers of Uzbekistan
National University of Uzbekistan alumni
1949 births
Living people